Macrolophus is a genus of plant bugs in the family Miridae. There are at least 20 described species in Macrolophus.

Species
These 28 species belong to the genus Macrolophus:

 Macrolophus aragarsanus Carvalho, 1945 c g
 Macrolophus basicornis (Stål, 1860) c g
 Macrolophus brevicornis Knight c g b
 Macrolophus caliginosus Wagner, 1951 c g
 Macrolophus costalis Fieber, 1858 c g
 Macrolophus crudus (Van Duzee, 1916) c g
 Macrolophus cuiabanus Carvalho, 1945 c g
 Macrolophus cuibanus Carvalho g
 Macrolophus diffractus (Van Duzee, 1923) c g
 Macrolophus epilobii V. Putshkov, 1978 c g
 Macrolophus ethiopius Cassis, 1986 c g
 Macrolophus glaucescens Fieber, 1858 c g
 Macrolophus hexaradiatus Carvalho and Carpintero, 1986 c g
 Macrolophus innotatus Carvalho, 1968 c g
 Macrolophus klotho Linnavuori, 1992 c g
 Macrolophus longicornis (Poppius, 1914) c
 Macrolophus lopezi (Van Duzee, 1923) i c g
 Macrolophus melanotoma (A. Costa, 1853) c g
 Macrolophus mimuli Knight, 1968 i c g
 Macrolophus pericarti Heiss and Ribes, 1998 c g
 Macrolophus praeclarus (Distant, 1884) c g
 Macrolophus punctatus Carvalho, 1968 c g
 Macrolophus pygmaeus (Rambur, 1839) i c g b
 Macrolophus rivalis (Knight, 1943) c g
 Macrolophus saileri Carvalho, 1947 c g
 Macrolophus separatus (Uhler, 1894) i c g b
 Macrolophus tenuicornis Blatchley, 1926 i c g b
 Macrolophus usingeri (Knight, 1943) c g

Data sources: i = ITIS, c = Catalogue of Life, g = GBIF, b = Bugguide.net

References

Further reading

External links

 

Miridae genera
Dicyphini